Luís de Menezes Bragança (Konkani: लुईझ दॆ मॆनॆज़ॆस ब्रागान्सा; 15 January 1878 – 10 July 1938), alternatively spelled as Luís de Menezes Braganza, was a prominent Indian journalist, writer, politician and anti-colonial activist from Goa. He was one of the few Goan aristocrats who actively opposed the Portuguese colonisation of Goa. During his lifetime, Menezes Bragança was widely hailed around the Lusosphere (Portuguese speaking world) as "O Maior de todos" ("The Greatest of all Goans") and in the Indian mainland as "The Tilak of Goa".

Early life 
Luís de Menezes Bragança was born as Luís de Menezes on 15 January 1878 in Chandor, Salcette, to a Chardo family. His mother hailed from the illustrious Bragança clan of the same village. Later on in life, his maternal grandfather Francis Xavier Bragança who had no sons, nominated Luís, his eldest grandson as his heir. Luís then adopted his maternal surname as his own surname and subsequently became Luís de Menezes Bragança. This was contrary to Portuguese custom, whereby the maternal surname is typically followed by the paternal surname. He did his primary education at the Rachol Seminary and then at the Lyceum in Panjim. Although raised a Roman Catholic, Menezes Bragança later became an agnostic.

The Menezes Braganza house 
The Menezes Braganza Pereira house is located at the Chandor village in Goa. It is known to be more than 350 years old and is situated near the church square in Chandor. This mansion is the most exquisite heritage house in the countryside, the biggest in Goa and also has a Portuguese style facade. It is a museum of chandeliers, painting, porcelain, crystal, period furniture and other antique items.
According to family history, in the 17th century A.F.S. Braganza Pereira was representing Goa under the Portuguese government as a vice consul general in Spain. He was gifted the land by the king of Portugal, Don Luiz on which the mansion is now located. Later after a few generations, the house was divided into two equal halves as it was inherited by two sisters in the family. It was named after their 
husbands - Menezes Branganza (west wing) and Braganza Pereira (east wing) and is still inhabited by descendants of the two families.
The Portuguese style outer facade that gives entry to both wings of the mansion with 24 windows is the longest in Goa. The house made up of laterite has a garden with mosaic seats, tables and fountains. A nail of St. Francis Xavier is held by the Petite Chapel that is still used in the Braganza Periera House. Two chairs bearing the coat of arms gifted by the Portuguese king are there in the huge ballroom.
Aurea is the only living member of the fourteenth generation and Allan, Andre are the sixteenth generation of this house.

Journalistic career 
By the age of twenty, Menezes Bragança had gained a reputation as a fine writer in the Portuguese language. On 22 January 1900, together with another Goan writer Messias Gomes he co-founded O Heraldo (The Herald), which was the first Portuguese-language daily in Goa. His columns in the newspaper were typified by satirical wit, wherein he would attack the Portuguese government and reactionary thinking from Hindu and Catholic intellectuals. Menezes Bragança was a strong believer in secularism and propounded the ideals of a Secular republic in his columns, prior to the formation of the Portuguese First Republic on 5 October 1910.

In 1911, he founded O Debate (The Debate), of which he was the principal editor until 1921. During this period, he also strove to awaken the political consciousness and cultural identity of the Goan people. Menezes Bragança was a regular contributor to Pracasha (Light), a Konkani-language weekly wherein he wrote in great length on subjects such as freedom of thought, freedom of expression and freedom from oppression. His writings provided a great deal of information about the Indian independence movement to the Goan public, and as such, was avidly read by them for news about the Indian mainland. On 1 December 1919, Menezes Bragança founded another Portuguese-language daily Diário de Noite (The Evening News). Like O Debate, this daily also had a wide Goan readership and dealt with the events in the Indian mainland as well as Goan cultural issues.

Activism 

Menezes Bragança was a staunch advocate for the cause of Konkani. In 1914, he began a campaign in defence of the language in O Heraldo, urging its development. In this, he received the wide support of the Goan intelligentsia. He advocated the impartation of primary school education in Konkani, and blamed the Portuguese authorities' preoccupation with denationalisation of the Goan people for its failure to encourage the language. Menezes Bragança championed the cause of the less privileged sections of Goan society. In 1933, with the coming to power of the Estado Novo regime headed by António de Oliveira Salazar in Portugal, he placed himself at the head of the anti-colonialist movement in Goa. After the promulgation of the racist Portuguese Colonial Act in 1930, he proposed a resolution at the Legislative council in Panjim on 3 July of the same year. The resolution upheld the right of self-determination for Goans from the Portuguese rule, and was duly adopted. Menezes Bragança was the first person to call for an independent Goa and as such, was generally hailed as the "father of Goan unrest". His brother-in-law Tristão de Bragança Cunha was also a prominent Indian nationalist.

Associations 
Menezes Bragança held many high positions in various organisations during his lifetime. He was elected President of the Municipality of Ilhas, leader of the elected Opposition in the Government Council and Legislative Assembly, President of the Provincial Congress of Goa (1921) and Portuguese India's delegate to the Colonial Conference held in Lisbon in 1924. He was a member of an eminent elite cultural organisation, Instituto Vasco da Gama.

Works 
Menezes Bragança was a prolific author of books. Some of his most notable works are Life of St. Luís de Gonzaga, Model and Protector of Youth (1893), The Neuter School (1914), The Comunidades and the Cult (1914), The Castes (1915), An Open Letter to Dr. Afonso Costa (1916), A Rev. Master Flayed (1916), India and her Problems (1924), Tourism in Goa (1927), Letter to an innocent (1927), and About an Idea (1928).

Death 
Towards the final years of his life, Menezes Bragança was persecuted by the Estado Novo regime for his outspoken criticism of their government. His demand for the granting of autonomy to Goa was refused, and his newspapers were shut down by order of Salazar. He died on 10 July 1938 in Chandor. Fearing an outbreak of nationalist protests in Goa, the Portuguese government stationed troops at his grave to prevent any homage from being paid to his memory.

Legacy
At his 25th death anniversary in 1963, the Instituto Vasco da Gama was renamed by its management to Institute Menezes Braganza in honour of his memory. A bust of Bragança exists in the Institute. Another bust of him is located in the Margao Municipal Garden.

Professor Dr. Sushila Sawant Mendes has published a book entitled, "Luis de Menezes Bragança: Nationalism, Secularism and free-thought in Portuguese Goa". This book is based on the doctoral thesis of Mendes, awarded to her by the Goa University in 2012.

Citations

References 

.

.
.

Further reading 

Indian male journalists
Journalists from Goa
Goa liberation activists
1878 births
1938 deaths
Colonial Goa
Former Roman Catholics
History of Goa
Indian agnostics
Goa politicians
Portuguese-language writers
Portuguese people of Goan descent
Portuguese politicians of Indian descent
19th-century Indian journalists
20th-century Indian journalists
19th-century Indian male writers
People from South Goa district
Indian former Christians